The following lists events that happened during 1889 in Australia.

Incumbents

Premiers
Premier of New South Wales – Henry Parkes until 16 January, then George Dibbs 17 January-7 March, then Henry Parkes
Premier of Queensland – Boyd Dunlop Morehead
Premier of South Australia – Thomas Playford II until 27 June, then John Cockburn
Premier of Tasmania – Philip Fysh
Premier of Victoria – Duncan Gillies

Governors
Governor of New South Wales – Lord Carrington
Governor of Queensland – Henry Wylie Norman 
Governor of South Australia – Sir William Robinson until 5 March, then 9th Earl of Kintore
Governor of Tasmania – Sir Robert Hamilton
Governor of Victoria – Lord Loch
Governor of Western Australia – Sir Frederick Broome

Arts and literature

 17 August – The 9 by 5 Impression Exhibition, featuring works by Tom Roberts, Arthur Streeton and Charles Conder, was opened in Melbourne.
 21 December – The poem "Clancy of the Overflow", by Banjo Paterson, is first published in The Bulletin magazine.

Sport
 5 October –  defeat  by 2 goals to win the 1889 SAFA Grand Final, the first Grand Final in Australian rules football.
November – Bravo wins the Melbourne Cup

Births
 23 February – Lucy Godiva Woodcock, pacifist, schoolteacher, trade union official and women's activist (died 1968)
 18 April – Jessie Street, feminist and suffragette (died 1970)
 20 April –  Cuthbert Butler, politician (died 1950)
 18 September – Doris Blackburn, politician (died 1970)
 27 October – Fanny Durack, swimmer (died 1956)

Deaths
 9 February – Peter Lalor, Eureka Stockade leader (born 1827)
 5 November – Peter Warburton, explorer (born 1813)

References

 
Australia
Years of the 19th century in Australia